Mansour Al-Najjar (born 22 December 1994) is a Saudi football player who currently plays as a midfielder for Jeddah.

References

External links 
 

1994 births
Living people
Sportspeople from Mecca
Association football midfielders
Saudi Arabian footballers
Al-Wehda Club (Mecca) players
Al-Qadsiah FC players
Al-Kholood Club players
Jeddah Club players
Saudi Professional League players
Saudi First Division League players